Robin Stephenson (born June 21, 1983) is a former American professional tennis player. Her career-high WTA singles ranking is No. 435, which she reached on February 11, 2008. Her career-high doubles ranking is 157, set on December 8, 2008.

She played collegiately for the Alabama Crimson Tide, earning All-American honors in 2005 for a national ranking of No. 6 in singles.  She was a volunteer assistant coach for the Georgia Tech Yellow Jackets women's tennis team, before moving on to Georgia State and eventually to the University of Washington, where she is the current head coach.

ITF Circuit finals

Doubles: 20 (13–7)

References

External links
 
 

1983 births
Living people
American female tennis players
American people of Canadian descent
Georgia Tech Yellow Jackets women's tennis coaches
21st-century American women
Alabama Crimson Tide women's tennis players
American tennis coaches